Flight Deck Névé is an elevated and unusually flat glacier névé, about , between Flagship Mountain and Mount Razorback in the Convoy Range of Victoria Land, Antarctica. The feature is the primary source of ice to the east-flowing Benson Glacier at Scuppers Icefalls. It is one of a group of nautical names in the Convoy Range applied by the New Zealand Geographic Board in 1994.

References 

Snow fields of Victoria Land
Scott Coast
Névés of Antarctica